Peaslee is a surname. Notable people with the surname include:

Charles H. Peaslee (1804–1866), U.S. Representative from New Hampshire
Janice L. Peaslee (born 1935), American politician
Richard Peaslee, composer for the theatre in London

See also
Janice Peaslee Bridge, a pin-connected steel & wrought iron Pratt through truss bridge connecting Stratford, New Hampshire to Maidstone, Vermont